Chistopol  was an airport in Russia located 7 km southwest of Chistopol.  It was a small airport, with a single tarmac runway with one building.

Overhead imagery from Google Earth shows a structure, equipment and materials on the runway, beginning before 1 May 2014.  Other imagery through 10 August 2018 demonstrates the structure has remained in place.  Furthermore, security fencing has been installed and various pieces of equipment within and without the fence, being moved from time-to-time.  It appears this airport has been re-purposed as an equipment and materials storage depot.

References
RussianAirFields.com

External links 
 Official website of Chistopol municipal district 
 The article about local airlines on the website of the republican newspaper 

Airports built in the Soviet Union
Airports in Tatarstan